Olga Leonardovna Knipper-Chekhova (– 22 March 1959) was a Russian and Soviet stage actress. She was married to Anton Chekhov.

Knipper was among the 39 original members of the Moscow Art Theatre when it was formed by Konstantin Stanislavski in 1898. She played Arkadina in The Seagull (1898), played Elena in the Moscow premiere of Uncle Vanya (1899), and was the first to play Masha in Three Sisters (1901) and Madame Ranevskaya in The Cherry Orchard (1904). She married Anton Chekhov, the author of these plays, in 1901. She played Ranevskaya again in 1943, when the theatre marked the 300th performance of The Cherry Orchard.

Early life
Though both of her parents were of German origin, her father claimed Russia as their family heritage. Around the time of Olga's birth, her father, Leonard, was in charge of a factory in Glazov, a small town northeast of European Russia. Two years after she was born, her family moved to Moscow, where they became accustomed to an upper-middle-class lifestyle. Growing up in between her two brothers, Konstantin and Vladimir, Olga was pampered. She attended a private school for girls, was fluent in French, German and English, and took music and singing lessons after rigorous school days. She showed considerable promise as a painter and was her own accompanist on the piano when she entertained friends and family at dinner parties. Her father, however, who was anxious to conform to the social conventions of his adopted country, made it clear that Olga's aspirations should be confined to marrying well and becoming a housewife. Her mother, a talented singer and pianist, had been forced to give up any hopes of a career in the arts, and felt that Olga should do the same.

In 1894, Olga's father died unexpectedly, leaving the 25-year-old and her mother with debts he left behind from living well beyond their means. They began giving music and singing lessons to make ends meet, dismissed four of their five servants, and moved to a smaller flat. Olga's hopes of becoming a successful stage actress had not yet diminished. Proceeding with her intentions without her mother's approval, and giving up her social circle relations, were sacrifices she was willing to make: "Whenever in my life I really wanted something, and really believed in the possibility of achieving what I wanted and acted energetically, I always succeeded and never regretted going my own way", she wrote.

Career
She enrolled briefly into the Maly Theatre's drama school, although she dropped out one month later. With the help of her reluctant mother, Olga enrolled at the Philharmonic School, where she was taught by the future co-founder of the Moscow Art Theatre, Vladimir Nemirovich-Danchenko. Nemirovich introduced Knipper and fellow student Vsevolod Meyerhold (who would later become one of the most prominent figures of Russian theatre after the Revolution) to Constantin Stanislavski.

Told in strict confidence, Nemirovich confessed to Knipper and Meierhold that he and Stanislavski were planning the creation of a new theatre company. Nemirovich assured the two actors that they would be invited to join this company and to help lead it to greatness. After many weeks, enough capital was finally secured to found the new company. The company gathered in Pushkino, where Stanislavski addressed Knipper and the other members, telling them that he hoped they had all come to dedicate their lives to creating the "first rational, moral, and universally accessible theatre in Russia."

Chekhov

While rehearsing for The Seagull on 9 September, Olga's 30th birthday, she met Russia's most eligible literary bachelor and playwright of The Seagull, Anton Chekhov, then 38. Knipper and Chekhov exchanged telegrams and letters for the next few years, while Olga became more familiar with Chekhov's younger sister, Masha. Random letters of teasing and playfulness became letters of love and deep remorse that they lived so far apart from each other. Olga's true colors shone throughout her letters of correspondence. Her ill-moods, volatile tempers, combined with her sporadic high spirits, kept Chekhov on his toes. In the winter of 1900, Chekhov returned from Yalta and headed to Moscow, with a new play that he had written with a 'dear actress' in mind. "What a part I’ve got for you in Three Sisters. Give me ten rubles and you can have it, otherwise I’ll give it to another actress", Chekhov wrote to Olga.

Many similarities existed between Olga Knipper and the character Chekhov wrote for her in Three Sisters, Masha. Knipper was to play the middle of three sisters and one brother. The only married sibling of the foursome and "the most original and talented of the three sisters. To portray a young woman of culture and refinement, who speaks French, German and English, and is a first-class pianist" was no problem for Knipper who already acquired those skills. Knipper received much praise for her portrayal as Masha, much to Chekhov's amusement.

Anton Chekhov and Olga Knipper eventually married on 25 May 1901 at the Church of the Exaltation of the Cross. It was a spur of the moment, small wedding about which hardly anyone knew, including Chekhov's mother and sister, and Olga's mother. Many close friends and family were hurt by the secrecy. Their marriage ended when Chekhov died of tuberculosis in 1904.

It has been claimed in 1902 she had an operation to abort an ectopic pregnancy. The conception must have taken place at a time when she and Chekhov were temporarily living apart and he could not have been the father; as Chekhov was a doctor he would have realised this.

Death
Olga Leonardovna Knipper-Chekhova worked with the Moscow Art Theatre for the remainder of her life. On 22 March 1959, she died in Moscow, USSR, at age 90

References

External links
Pitcher, Harvey. Chekhov's Leading Lady: a Portrait of the Actress Olga Knipper. New York and London: Franklin Watts, 1980.

1868 births
1959 deaths
19th-century actresses from the Russian Empire
20th-century Russian actresses
People from Glazov
People from Glazovsky Uyezd
Actresses from the Russian Empire
People's Artists of the USSR
Stalin Prize winners
Recipients of the Order of Lenin
Recipients of the Order of the Red Banner of Labour
Russian people of German descent
Russian stage actresses
Soviet stage actresses
Burials at Novodevichy Cemetery